The Checheho River is a small river located in north-central Ethiopia. Part of the watershed of the Abay River, it rises to the east of Debre Zebit to flow south to join the Bashilo River. Its major tributary is the Zhit'a, which enters the Checheho on the left side.

Checheho town
Checheho town is located near the source of the homonymous river, along the highway between Weldiya and Debre Tabor. The town (2750 metres above sea level) holds an important monastery.

See also 
 List of rivers of Ethiopia

References 
 

Amhara Region
Rivers of Ethiopia